Leostyletus pseudomisakiensis is a species of sea slug or nudibranch, a marine gastropod mollusc in the family Eubranchidae.

Distribution
This species was described from the Sea of Japan.

References

Eubranchidae
Gastropods described in 1998
Molluscs of Japan